The Western Qing tombs are located some  southwest of Beijing in Yi County, Hebei Province. They constitute a necropolis that incorporates four royal mausoleums where seventy-eight royal members are buried. These include four emperors of the Qing dynasty and their empresses, imperial concubines, princes and princesses, as well as other royal servants.

History
Construction of the Western Qing tombs was initiated by the Yongzheng Emperor who broke with tradition and refused to be buried in the Eastern Qing tombs. Some have speculated, though not proven, that as Yongzheng had illegally usurped the throne by eliminating his brothers, his motive to relocate his tomb to the Western Qing tombs was that he did not wish to be buried alongside his father the Kangxi Emperor. Later on his son, the Qianlong Emperor, decided that he should be buried in the Eastern Qing tombs and dictated that thereafter burials should alternate between the eastern and western sites, although this was not followed consistently.

The first tomb, the Tailing, was completed in 1737, two years after the end of the Yongzheng reign. The last imperial interment was in 1913, when the Guangxu Emperor was entombed in the Chongling. Chongling was looted by grave robbers in 1938, and its burial chamber is now open to the public.

Main tombs

The four tombs in Western Qing Tombs are:
 Tailing (Manchu: elhe munggan) for the Yongzheng Emperor (16781735, the 3rd emperor)
 Changling (Manchu: colgoroko munggan) for the Jiaqing Emperor (17601820, the 5th emperor)
 Muling (Manchu: gūnihangga munggan) for the Daoguang Emperor (17821850, the 6th emperor)
 Chongling (Manchu: wesihun munggan) for the Guangxu Emperor (18711908, the 9th emperor)

The last emperor, Puyi, is buried in a commercial cemetery behind the Guangxu Emperor's tomb. While not officially part of the Western Qing Tombs, including Puyi would bring the number of emperors at the Western Tombs to five, the same number as those buried at the Eastern Tombs.

See also
 Eastern Qing tombs
 Imperial Tombs of the Ming and Qing Dynasties

References

Tombs
Major National Historical and Cultural Sites in Hebei
Qing tombs
Qing tombs
Qing tombs
Qing tombs
Qing tombs
World Heritage Sites in China